Operation Rekstok was a series of South African raids into southern Angola on 7 March 1979 during the South African Border War. The operation lasted six days. Operating from Ovamboland, SADF forces entered Angola and attacked SWAPO bases at Mongua, Oncocua, Henhombe and Heque. During the operation, a SAAF bomber was shot down, killing Lieutenant Wally Marais and Second Lieutenant O. J. Doyle. The SADF conducted Rekstok concurrently with Operation Safraan and later performed Operation Sceptic.

References

Further reading
 
 

Conflicts in 1979
1979 in South Africa
1979 in South West Africa
1979 in Angola
Cross-border operations of South Africa
Battles and operations of the South African Border War
March 1979 events in Africa